Mary Teresa Barra (née Makela; born December 24, 1961) is an American businesswoman who has been the chair and chief executive officer (CEO) of General Motors since January 15, 2014. She is the first female CEO of a 'Big Three' automaker. In December 2013, GM named her to succeed Daniel Akerson as CEO. Prior to being named CEO, Barra was executive vice president of global product development, purchasing, and supply chain.

Early life 
Barra was born in Royal Oak, Michigan to parents of Finnish descent. Her grandfather, Viktor Mäkelä, moved to the US and married Maria Luoma, a Finnish immigrant from Teuva. They lived in Mountain Iron, Minnesota and had three children, including a son named Reino, called Ray. Barra's father, Ray, married a second-generation Finnish American named Eva Pyykkönen, and Mary was born in 1961.

Education 
Barra graduated from the General Motors Institute (now Kettering University) in 1985, where she obtained a Bachelor of Science in Electrical Engineering. Barra was inducted into the engineering honor society Tau Beta Pi (MI Zeta class of 1985) and the honor society IEEE-Eta Kappa Nu (Theta Epsilon chapter 1983) while at Kettering University.  She then attended Stanford Graduate School of Business on a GM fellowship, receiving a Master of Business Administration degree in 1990.

Career

General Motors 

Barra started working for General Motors in 1980 as a co-op student, when she was 18 years old. Her job was checking fender panels and inspecting hoods, and she used this job to pay for her college tuition. She subsequently held a variety of engineering and administrative positions, including managing the Detroit/Hamtramck Assembly plant.

In February 2008, she became vice president of Global Manufacturing Engineering. In July 2009, she advanced to the position of vice president of global human resources, which she held until February 2011, when she was named executive vice president of Global Product Development. The latter position included responsibilities for design; she has worked to reduce the number of automobile platforms in GM. In August 2013, her vice president responsibility was extended to include Global Purchasing and Supply Chain.

When Barra took over as chief executive of General Motors in January 2014, she became the first female head of an automobile manufacturer.

During her first year as CEO, General Motors issued 84 safety recalls involving over 30 million cars. Barra was called before the Senate to testify about the recalls and deaths attributed to the faulty ignition switch. Barra and General Motors also came under suspicion of paying for awards to burnish the CEO and corporation's image during that time. The recalls led to the creation of new policies encouraging workers to report problems they encounter in an attempt to change company culture.

As CEO, Barra made GM move into driverless and electric-powered cars through acquisitions including Strobe, a startup in driverless technology. 

In 2017, Barra was the highest paid Detroit Three executive, with a total remuneration of $21.96 million. In November 2018, Barra announced the closure of five North American plants and 14,000 worker lay offs. Her decision was criticized by President Donald Trump, who threatened to remove the company's government subsidies in response.

In a June 2022 question about reinstating dividends at GM, Barra said the company has a "clear priority" to "accelerate our EV plans" and to solely offer EVs by 2035.

Boards and councils 

Barra was a member of the General Dynamics board of directors. She serves on the board of directors of the Detroit Economic Club and Detroit Country Day School. She is a member of the Stanford University Board of Trustees, the Stanford Graduate School of Business Advisory Council, and the Duke University Board of Trustees.

In August 2017, she was elected to the board of Disney. She was the 12th person elected to this board, and the fourth woman.

Awards and honors 

Barra was listed as 35th on Forbes Most Powerful Women list in 2013, rising in rank to fourth most powerful in 2018.

In May 2014, she delivered the commencement address for University of Michigan's Ann Arbor campus at Michigan Stadium, and received an honorary degree. In 2018, she received an honorary doctorate from Duke University and in 2022 she delivered as the school's commencement address.

Barra was ranked first in Fortune's Most Powerful Women list in 2015, up from second the year before.

She remained in the number one spot in Fortune's Most Powerful Women of 2017 and Number 5 on Forbes World's 100 Most Powerful Women List in the same year.

In April 2014, Barra was featured on the cover of Time's "100 Most Influential People in the World."

In December 2016, Barra joined a business forum assembled by then President-Elect Donald Trump to provide strategic and policy advice on economic issues. However, she left the forum in 2017, following Trump's response to the Charlottesville protests.

Barra was elected to the National Academy of Engineering in February 2018. In September 2018, Barra was awarded the Yale Chief Executive Leadership Institute's Legend in Leadership Award.

In Institutional Investors yearly survey of top executives, the 2019 All-America Executive Team, Barra achieved the first place in the autos and auto parts sector.

Barra was selected for the inaugural 2021 Forbes 50 Over 50; made up of entrepreneurs, leaders, scientists and creators who are over the age of 50. In 2021, she was included in the Time 100, Times annual list of the 100 most influential people in the world.

Personal life 

Barra is married to consultant Tony Barra, whom she met while studying at Kettering University, and has two children and two dogs. They live in Northville, a suburb of Detroit. She also owns an apartment in Downtown Detroit.

She has named the Chevrolet Camaro and the Pontiac Firebird as her favorite cars. Barra can speak a little Finnish.

References 

|-

1961 births
Living people
21st-century American businesspeople
21st-century American businesswomen
American chief executives in the automobile industry
American chief executives of Fortune 500 companies
American chief executives of manufacturing companies
American corporate directors
American people of Finnish descent
American women chief executives
Automotive businesspeople
Businesspeople from Michigan
General Motors executives
Kettering University alumni
People from Royal Oak, Michigan
Stanford Graduate School of Business alumni
Stanford University trustees
Women corporate directors